JAMK University of Applied Sciences is a university of applied sciences (a polytechnic) in Finland, in the region of Central Finland. There are several bachelor's degree programs offered in English:
 International Business
 Game Production
 Purchasing and Logistics Engineering
 Nursing
 Tourism Management
 Information and Communication Technology.

There are also master's degree programs in English:
 Cyber Security
 International Business Management
 Sport Business Management
 Artificial Intelligence and Data Analytics
 Sport and Exercise Physiotherapy
 Professional Project Management.

Its campuses are located in Jyväskylä and Saarijärvi.

References

External links
Official website

Universities and colleges in Finland
Educational institutions established in 1994
1994 establishments in Finland